Bryan John Trottier (born July 17, 1956) is a Canadian-American former professional ice hockey centre who played 18 seasons in the National Hockey League (NHL) for the New York Islanders and Pittsburgh Penguins. He won four Stanley Cups with the Islanders, two with the Penguins and one as an assistant coach with the Colorado Avalanche. He shares the NHL record for points in a single period with six (four goals and two assists) in the second period against the Rangers on December 23, 1978. He is also one of only eight NHL players with multiple five-goal games. On August 4, 2014, Trottier was announced as an assistant coach for the Buffalo Sabres. In 2017 Trottier was named one of the "100 Greatest NHL Players" in history.

Early life 
Trottier grew up in the town of Val Marie, Saskatchewan, Canada, located between Swift Current and the Montana border with his parents and four siblings. His father is of Cree Métis descent, and his mother is of Irish origin. Growing up in the 1960s, Trottier wanted to be like his idol Jean Béliveau. When he was learning to skate, his father would clear out the dam on the creek across their home with a machete, to create a surface to practice on.

As a child, Trottier played for the Climax Hockey Team in Climax, Saskatchewan and for the Swift Current Broncos as a junior.

Trottier has one older sister, Carol, and three younger siblings, Kathy, Monty and Rocky. Monty played professional minor league hockey, and Rocky played in 38 games for the New Jersey Devils.

Playing career

Trottier claims that without his friend Tiger Williams, he would have dropped out of hockey due to homesickness. Trottier and Tiger became best friends due to the special bond they built early on in their careers/academy.

Nicknamed "Trots," Trottier was drafted in the second round, 22nd overall, by the New York Islanders in the 1974 NHL Entry Draft, the team he played his first 15 seasons in the NHL with. He set an NHL rookie record of 95 points and won the Calder Memorial Trophy as the NHL's rookie of the year in 1975–76, though the record was later broken by Peter Šťastný of the Quebec Nordiques in 1980–81.

Trottier's best offensive season was 1978–79 when he scored 134 points, earning him the Art Ross Trophy as the League's top scorer, as well as the Hart Memorial Trophy as NHL MVP. In winning the Art Ross, he became the first player from a post-Original Six expansion team to win the award. In that same season, he led the NHL in assists with 87, which he had also done the year before with 77.

Trottier was one of the core players on the Islanders' dynasty teams from the 1980s. He won four Stanley Cups during his time with the Islanders from 1980 to 1983. During New York's first Stanley Cup in 1980, he won the Conn Smythe Trophy as playoff MVP. In 1981–82, Trottier scored 50 goals, the highest single-season total of his career.

During the early 1980s, when Wayne Gretzky set numerous scoring marks, Islanders broadcaster Stan Fischler and head coach Al Arbour nonetheless maintained that Trottier was the league's best player over Gretzky. Trottier was described as a forward possessing an all-around game including ruggedness and defensive responsibility, and there have been comparisons to Milt Schmidt and Gordie Howe. Arbour stated, "Gretzky is an offensive genius for sure. But at this stage Trots gives you more things. Defensively, he's outstanding. And he's physically tough. He comes up with his 100 points a year, automatically, along with everything else!"

Trottier was often referred to as the "glue" on the Islanders team, centring his fellow stars Clark Gillies and Mike Bossy on a line known as "The Trio Grande." While the 1977–78 season was Bossy's rookie year, the Trio Grande at one point led the NHL in scoring above the top lines of the Montreal Canadiens and the Colorado Rockies. Other linemates that played with Trottier included John Tonelli, Bob Bourne and Bob Nystrom. Trottier, however, was most known for his dynamic on-ice partnership with Mike Bossy during his prime years with the Islanders until Bossy's early retirement at the end of the 1987 season.

Undaunted by heavy criticism from fellow Canadians, Trottier chose to play for the United States in the 1984 Canada Cup tournament, after having previously represented Canada in 1981, because he wanted to pay back the country in which he lived and because his wife was American. He was able to obtain the necessary U.S. citizenship in July 1984 because he had Métis ancestry on his father's side (Cree/Chippewa). His North American Indian Card (for which he qualified because his grandmother was a Chippewa) entitled him to citizenship in both the U.S. and Canada, as well as a U.S. passport, which was all he needed for tournament eligibility.

Unlike other star centremen, longevity was not Trottier's hallmark. Following his 13th season, his skills seemed to deteriorate precipitously, decreasing from 82 points in 1988 to 45 points just one year later, and 24 points in 1990. After that low output, Islanders management released Trottier from his contract, believing that his best years were behind him and that younger centers such as Pat LaFontaine and Brent Sutter should get his ice time. He ranks second in Islanders history in goals, and first in assists and points. It could be noted, however, that even as Trottier's scoring declined, he remained a strong defensive player and team leader.

The Pittsburgh Penguins signed Trottier as a free agent to provide experience and leadership to a young team. He won the Stanley Cup for the fifth and sixth times with Pittsburgh in 1991 and 1992, respectively. Trottier took the 1992–93 season off, returning to the Isles in a front-office capacity, but financial troubles, stemming from poor investments, forced Trottier to return to the ice with the Penguins for the 1993–94 season. He retired again following a disappointing final season where he scored just four goals in 41 games. At the time of his retirement, his point total ranked sixth in NHL history.

Post-retirement

Following his retirement, Trottier played for the Pittsburgh Phantoms of the Roller Hockey International league in its 1994 season.

Trottier was inducted into the Hockey Hall of Fame in his first year of eligibility in 1997.

After many of his Islander teammates, including linemates Mike Bossy and Clark Gillies, were honored by the Islanders organization by having their numbers retired, Trottier was expected to be next; his number 19 was eventually raised to the rafters on October 20, 2001.

On March 4, 2006, the Islanders celebrated the 26th anniversary of the team's first Stanley Cup championship. Trottier, apparently forgiven for his coaching stint with the rival New York Rangers, was given one of the largest ovations of the evening. He gave a familiar salute to the fans who lined up to watch a pre-game "Walk of Champions" entering the building, raising both hands high above his head, reminiscent of his days playing on the Island where he would do the same to the fans cheering him on. The Islanders played against the Philadelphia Flyers that night, who, coincidentally, was the team that the Islanders faced in the Finals during their first Stanley Cup championship. The Islanders won by a score of 4–2. On June 1, 2006, Trottier returned to the Islanders as the team's executive director of player development.

Trottier is currently ranked 17th all-time in NHL regular-season points. He is ninth all-time in playoff points and remains the Islanders' all-time leader in assists and points. Trottier was named by Islanders fans as the second greatest player in franchise history, ahead of Denis Potvin and behind Mike Bossy.

Early on in Trottier's life, his mother, Marry Trottier, taught him an important lesson that would establish who he is. At a young age, Trottier faced discrimination and racism due to his native heritage. Trottier was called offensive things such as "half-breed". His mother's lesson to be proud of his native heritage is the reason that during his hall of fame induction speech, he decided to bring light to the issue. Trottier now travels to aboriginal communities and teaches kids about his heritage, and shares why it is special to be confident in today's world as an aboriginal. He believes that teaching them leadership skills and the ability to believe in who they are is vital for success in any field they choose to be in.

Coaching career
After serving as an assistant coach with the Pittsburgh Penguins until 1997, he took a similar position with the Colorado Avalanche, where he won his seventh career Stanley Cup in 2001.

Trottier was named as head coach of the New York Rangers in 2002, much to the ire of Islander fans. However, his brief stint with the Rangers lasted only 54 games, slightly longer than the halfway mark of the season. In addition to receiving criticism from Isles fans who labeled him a traitor, he drew the rage of Ranger fans as well, who felt he misused his offensively-gifted players—such as Eric Lindros and Pavel Bure—by having them play the neutral-zone trap (a defensive tactic used to slow down the opponent, but also limiting the user's offensive chances). At the time of his dismissal at the hands of General Manager Glen Sather, Trottier had coached 54 games, posting a 21–26–6–1 record and a .454 winning percentage. On July 29, 2014, Trottier was hired as an assistant coach for the Buffalo Sabres.

Personal life
Trottier has four children: Bryan Jr., Lindsey, Tayler and Christian.

Miscellaneous

Steve Yzerman, who was also renowned for his strong two-way play, considered Trottier his favourite player, donning the number 19 in honour of Trottier.

Of Trottier's 18 seasons in the NHL, he missed taking part in the post-season only once in 1988–89 after his Islanders team failed to qualify for the playoffs. Trottier sits 11th all-time with 184 playoff points on the strength of 71 goals (tied for 16th) and 113 assists (15th) in 221 games played (10th). As of the end of the 2012–13 season, there are no active NHL players in the top 25 all-time in playoff points to challenge Trottier's position.

Awards
 WCHL All-Star team – 1975
 Member of seven Stanley Cup winning teams: 1980, 1981, 1982 and 1983 with the New York Islanders, and 1991 and 1992 with the Pittsburgh Penguins and 2001 with the Colorado Avalanche as an assistant coach.
 Selected to nine NHL All-Star Games: 1976, 1978, 1980, 1981, 1982, 1983, 1985, 1986 and 1992
 Selected to two NHL first All-Star teams: 1978 and 1979
 Selected to two NHL second All-Star teams: 1982 and 1984
 Calder Memorial Trophy winner: 1976
 Art Ross Trophy winner: 1979
 Hart Memorial Trophy: 1979
 Conn Smythe Trophy: 1980
 King Clancy Memorial Trophy: 1989
 Recipient of the National Aboriginal Achievement Award, now the Indspire Awards, in the sports category: 1998
 Inducted in Canada's Sports Hall of Fame in 2016
Inducted into the Saskatchewan Sports Hall of Fame in 1997

Playing statistics

Regular season and playoffs

International

Coaching statistics

Records and achievements
 Most career games (Islanders) – 1,123;
 Most career points (Islanders) – 1,353;
 Most career assists (Islanders) – 853;
 Most assists in a season (Islanders) – 87 in 1978–79;

See also
 List of NHL statistical leaders
 List of players with 5 or more goals in an NHL game
 List of NHL players with 1000 points
 List of NHL players with 500 goals
 List of NHL players with 1000 games played

References

External links

1956 births
Living people
Art Ross Trophy winners
Buffalo Sabres coaches
Calder Trophy winners
Canadian emigrants to the United States
Canadian ice hockey right wingers
Canadian Métis people
Cincinnati Stingers draft picks
Colorado Avalanche coaches
Conn Smythe Trophy winners
Hart Memorial Trophy winners
Hockey Hall of Fame inductees
Ice hockey people from Saskatchewan
King Clancy Memorial Trophy winners
Lethbridge Broncos players
Métis sportspeople
National Hockey League All-Stars
National Hockey League players with retired numbers
New York Islanders draft picks
New York Islanders executives
New York Islanders players
New York Rangers coaches
Pittsburgh Penguins coaches
Pittsburgh Penguins players
Pittsburgh Phantoms (RHI) players
Stanley Cup champions
Swift Current Broncos players
Indspire Awards
Ice hockey player-coaches
Canadian ice hockey coaches